BJMC may refer to:
 B. J. Medical College, medical college in Pune, India
 B.J. Medical College, Ahmedabad, medical college in Ahmedabad, India
 Bangladesh Jute Mills corporation, a public corporation that owns and manages all government jute mills in Bangladesh 
 Team BJMC, sporting club in Bangladesh